Throughout its history, Sri Lanka, as it is known today, has been ruled by various monarchial lines, at some times with different lines ruling different parts of the modern state, or the entire state. 

The Sinhalese Monarchy was established in 543 BC with Prince Vijaya founding the Kingdom of Tambapanni and ended with Sri Vickrama Rajasinghe of Kandy in 1815 with the signing of the Kandyan Convention. This a list of all those who have reigned, in each of the successive Sinhala Kingdoms. The list of Sinhalese monarchs was recorded in the chronicles of the island such as the Deepavamsa, Mahavamsa, Chulavamsa and the Rajaveliya. This line of rulership contained both native Sinhalese and foreign rulers who ruled chronologically and in succession under the Sinhalese Monarchy.

In 1215, the invasion of Kalinga Magha led to the establishment of a line of monarchs of the Jaffna kingdom, who ruled a portion of Sri Lanka until the Kotte conquest of Jaffna Kingdom and the annexation of it into the Sinhalese kingdom, later the Portuguese captured the reestablished kingdom from Cankili II 1619.

In 1796 the British first entered the island and gained control of the coastal areas from the Dutch. After the Kandyan Wars and the signing of the Kandyan Convention in 1815 the island recognized the King of England as the King of Kandy, hence the British Monarch. This ended 2357 years of Sri Lankan monarchy. The Monarchs of Ceylon lasted from 1815 to 1972.

Lists of monarchs
Monarchs of the Sinhala Kingdoms
Monarchs of the Jaffna Kingdom or the 
Monarchs of the Dominion of Ceylon

References

Monarchs
Asian monarchs